Below are the following protected federal lands of the United States in the state of South Carolina.


National Parks
Congaree National Park

National Military Parks
Kings Mountain National Military Park

National Monuments
Fort Sumter National Monument

National Historical Sites
Charles Pinckney National Historic Site
Ninety Six National Historic Site

National Battlefields
Cowpens National Battlefield

National Trails

National Historic Trails
Overmountain Victory National Historic Trail

National Forests
Francis Marion National Forest
Sumter National Forest

National Wildlife Refuges
Cape Romain National Wildlife Refuge
Carolina Sandhills National Wildlife Refuge
ACE Basin National Wildlife Refuge
Pinckney Island National Wildlife Refuge
Santee National Wildlife Refuge
Savannah National Wildlife Refuge
Tybee National Wildlife Refuge
Waccamaw National Wildlife Refuge

National Estuarine Research Preserve
 ACE Basin National Estuarine Research Preserve
North Inlet-Winyah Bay National Estuarine Research Reserve

Department of Energy
Savannah River Site

Gallery

See also
List of South Carolina state forests
List of South Carolina state parks
List of South Carolina wildlife management areas
State of South Carolina

References
http://www.nps.gov/state/sc/index.htm

Federal lands
Federal lands in South Carolina